Bojan Kumar (born August 3, 1950) is a former Yugoslav ice hockey player. He played for the Yugoslavia men's national ice hockey team at the 1972 Winter Olympics in Sapporo and the 1976 Winter Olympics in Innsbruck.

References

1950 births
Living people
Ice hockey players at the 1972 Winter Olympics
Ice hockey players at the 1976 Winter Olympics
Olympic ice hockey players of Yugoslavia
Slovenian ice hockey defencemen
Sportspeople from Ljubljana
Yugoslav ice hockey defencemen
HDD Olimpija Ljubljana players